The Westminster and Middlesex Commission of Sewers was established in 1596 under the 1531 Statute of Sewers.

Its area was defined by statute in 1807, and before then by various letters patent.

It was absorbed by the Metropolitan Commission of Sewers on 1 January 1849.

References

History of local government in London (pre-1855)
Water supply and sanitation in London
Former water company predecessors of Thames Water